John Ermine of the Yellowstone is a 1917 American silent Western film directed by and starring Francis Ford. It is based on the novel of the same title by Frederic Remington.

Cast
 Francis Ford as John Ermine
 Mae Gaston as Katherine Searles
 Mark Fenton as Colonel Searles
 Duke Worne as Lieutenant Butler
 Burwell Hamrick as White Seasel
 William A. Carroll as Crooked Bear 
 Joseph Flores as Wolf Voice 
 Elsie Van Name as Mrs. Searles
 Dark Cloud as Fire Bear

References

External links
 

1917 films
1917 Western (genre) films
American black-and-white films
Films directed by Francis Ford
Silent American Western (genre) films
Universal Pictures films
1910s English-language films
1910s American films